Hir Rural District is in Hir District of Ardabil County, Ardabil province, Iran. At the census of 2006, its population was 8,548; there were 7,146 inhabitants in the following census of 2011; and in the most recent census of 2016, it had decreased to 5,840. The largest of its 17 villages was Keriq, with 1,278 people.

References 

Ardabil County

Rural Districts of Ardabil Province

Populated places in Ardabil Province

Populated places in Ardabil County